The River Lyde is a river in Buckinghamshire and tributary of the River Thame.  It rises at springs in Bledlow (which takes its name from the river) then flows due north west to join the Cuttle Brook about a mile east of Towersey in Oxfordshire.  It then goes to the north of Thame to join the River Thame.

It gives its name to the Lyde Garden, on the Carrington Estate, at Bledlow.

References 

 Royal Horticultural Society description of the river through gardens in Bledlow
 Image of the Lyde in 1900 care of English Heritage
 The Domesday Book online

External links

Rivers of Buckinghamshire
Rivers of Oxfordshire